Coralliophila pacei is a species of sea snail, a marine gastropod mollusk, in the family Muricidae, the murex snails or rock snails.

Description
Original description: "Shell small for genus, with ovate, inflated body whorl and elevated, scalariform spire; body whorl ornamented with 2 large fimbriated spiral cords, one at shoulder and one below (anterior to) mid-body; 3 small squamose spiral cords between suture and large shoulder cord; 2 small squamose spiral cords between 2 large cords around anterior end; 9 low varices per whorl; large scale produced at intersection of varix and spiral cord, giving shell fimbriated appearance; shell uniformly cream-white in color."

Distribution
Locus typicus: "Off Pompano outfall, Pompano Beach, Florida, USA."

This species recently discovered in Martinique, French West Indies.

References

pacei
Gastropods described in 1987